Frank Cummins (8 August 1906 – 27 April 1966) was an Australian cricketer. He played eleven first-class matches for New South Wales between 1925/26 and 1932/33.

See also
 List of New South Wales representative cricketers

References

External links
 

1906 births
1966 deaths
Australian cricketers
New South Wales cricketers
People from Maitland, New South Wales
Cricketers from New South Wales